The Amboseli Baboon Project is a long-term, individual-based research project on yellow baboons (Papio cynocephalus) in the Amboseli basin of southern Kenya. Founded in 1971, it is one of the longest-running studies of a wild primate in the world. Research at the Amboseli Baboon Project centers on processes at the individual, group, and population levels, and in recent years has also included other aspects of baboon biology, such as genetics, hormones, nutrition, hybridization, parasitology, and relations with other species. The project is affiliated with the Department of Ecology and Evolutionary Biology at Princeton University, the Department of Biology and the Evolutionary Anthropology Department at Duke University, and the Department of Biological Sciences at the University of Notre Dame.

The Amboseli Baboon Project is based in the Amboseli National Park and southwestern parts of the Amboseli ecosystem, near Kilimanjaro. Its primary research camp is based on the southern border of Amboseli National Park, near the former Olgulului Public Campsite.

Background 
The initial study of the project ran in 1963 - 1964, with a brief follow-up study in 1969. These laid the groundwork for the long-term, coordinated project which began in 1971. Since then, individually recognized baboons within the study groups have been followed on a near-daily basis.

The project was founded by Stuart Altmann and Jeanne Altmann (member of the United States National Academy of Sciences).

Present day 
The project is currently co-directed by Jeanne Altmann and Susan Alberts, with Beth Archie and Jenny Tung serving as associate directors. The majority of the project's data are collected by three long-term field observers, Raphael Mututua, who is also the project manager in Kenya, Serah Sayialel, and Kinyua Warutere.

Its funding has come from a number of sources over the years, including the National Science Foundation, National Institutes of Health, and the Chicago Zoological Society. The software developed by the project to manage the collected data, Babase, is produced with Open-source software and is itself Open-source software and available to the public. Over the period of its existence The Amboseli Baboon Project has produced over 230 peer-reviewed articles, reports, and popular accounts.

Discoveries
 Close social relationships among females improve their offsprings' chance of survival
 Young baboons who grow up without a father reach adulthood more slowly
 Mothers with low social status have sons with higher baseline stress levels
 Male baboons seem to identify their offspring and support them in conflicts
 Alpha and low-ranking males experience high stress, while beta males do not

References

External links
Amboseli Baboon Project
Babase: The Babase System Technical Specifications
Babase Chado: Chado and it's Integration with the Babase System

Amboseli National Park
Princeton University
Duke University
University of Notre Dame